The Parvin is a class of large patrol craft operated by the Islamic Republic of Iran Navy. They ships in the class are modified versions of PGM-71 vessels, all built by the American shipyard Peterson Builders.

Design
Sources differ in recording characteristics of Parvin class vessels.

Both sources agree that the ships are powered by eight General Motors diesel engines totaling  that rotate a pair of shafts, but the engine models are variously cited GM 8-71 and GM 6-71.

Original armament of the ships reportedly included five guns: 12.7mm and 20mm each two and one 40mm. French sources give one 40mm and four 20mm machine guns, as well as a pair of Mk22 Mousetrap and DC racks. As of 2015, they are reported to be armed with five guns consisting an old variant of Bofors 40 mm/60, a couple of Oerlikon GAI-BO1 20mm in addition to two 12.7 machine guns. They are also equipped with four racks of depth charge (with eight US Mk 6), and two missile launchers of unknown type are installed on them after refit.

The original radar was model 303 of Decca Radar, while the current surface search system is known to be working on I-band. The sonar is a high-frequency hull-mounted active attack SQS-17B but is allegedly unlikely to be serviceable per Jane's.

Crew on each ship of this class totals 20 officers and men.

Ships in the class
The ships in the class are:

References 

Ships built by Peterson Builders
Ship classes of the Islamic Republic of Iran Navy
Patrol boat classes